Viotá is a municipality and town of Colombia in the department of Cundinamarca.

External links
 Viota official website
 Viotá, 2003: Mere Coincidences?

References

Municipalities of Cundinamarca Department